Picws Du is the second highest peak of the Carmarthen Fans (or, in Welsh Bannau Sir Gâr) in the Carmarthenshire section of the Black Mountain in the west of the Brecon Beacons National Park in south Wales. The highest peak is Fan Foel immediately next along the ridge and it is a subsidiary summit of Fan Brycheiniog.
Picws Du falls within Fforest Fawr Geopark and its prominent summit is marked by a large Bronze Age round barrow at a height of 2457 feet above sea level. Waun Lefrith is the other, lower summit of the Bannau Sir Gâr / Carmarthen Fans situated to the west. The peak overlooks the glacial lake of Llyn y Fan Fach in the cwm below. As the peak sits on the edge of the escarpment on a ridge which juts out into the valley below, the views from the summit are panoramic and extensive. The views to the north are especially impressive when the weather is clear, looking towards the Cambrian Mountains, Mynydd Epynt and Brecon. Swansea and the Bristol Channel can just be seen on the horizon to the south, across the gently falling dip slope. Pen y Fan and Corn Du are distinctive landmarks seen directly to the east across Fforest Fawr.

Geology
Picws Du is formed from the sandstones and mudstones of the Brownstones Formation of the Old Red Sandstone laid down during the Devonian period. Its summit and southern slopes are formed from the hard-wearing sandstones of the overlying Plateau Beds Formation which are of upper/late Devonian age. The northwestern and northeast faces of Picws Du were home to small glaciers during the ice ages which gouged out the cirque of Pwll yr Henllyn and Pant y Bwlch. These cwms drain via the Afon Sawdde into the River Towy to the west. They also drain into the River Usk to the north, which then drains into the Usk Reservoir, visible from the summit of the mountain in the middle distance. The southern slopes drain into the Afon Twrch and the slopes to the east so into the River Tawe. The glacial lake of Llyn y Fan Fach is situated below the summit to the west, and is only slightly smaller than its companion Llyn y Fan Fawr about 2 miles to the east. There are several large linear moraines below the cliffs, similar to that below Fan Hir, and some of which retain small pools.

Archaeology
The summit hosts a very large Bronze Age round barrow which is in a degraded state and remains unexcavated. However, there are similar burial cairns at the summits of Pen y Fan and Fan Foel. The latter was excavated in 2002-4 with the results published in 2014 in Archaeologia Cambrensis. The round barrow was about 16 meters (about 52 feet) wide and was badly eroded with stones from the structure removed to build a central cairn by passing walkers. Excavation of the barrow showed that it contained two separate burials, the central one in a stone cist contained the burnt bones of an adult woman and two children carbon dated to about 2000 BC. It is likely that the barrow on Picws Du is of a similar age when the climate was much warmer than today, and the now deserted sub-arctic and tree-less landscape supported a larger human population than at present.
There are several legends associated with the glacial lake below the summit, Llyn y Fan Fach, one of which is the story of the Lady of the Lake.

Access

The entire mountain is open country and so freely accessible to walkers. The most popular approach includes a circuit of the neighbouring peaks of Waun Lefrith and Fan Foel. The high level route of the Beacons Way from Llangadog to Abergavenny runs over Picws Du whilst the low level route runs up to Llyn y Fan Fach and beside the Afon Sychlwch at the foot of its northern escarpment. The higher route follows the edge of the escarpment from near Fan Hir, where the path climbs the escarpment from Llyn y Fan Fawr. Stone pavements have been added at especially wet parts of the path, where the path crosses peat bogs. There is a well built stone staircase climbing the escarpment where the Beacons Way rises from Llyn y Fan Fawr to Fan Brycheiniog.

Access to the mountain is also possible from the car park at the foot of the road leading   the small dam on Llyn y Fan Fach. The road gives an easy but steep route to the lake, and Picws Du looms large over the scene. The footpath rises from the dam wall up the ridge to the east until it reaches the cliff above the lake. It then follows the cliff edge across Waun Lefrith to the summit, passing several rock outcrops and gullies dropping to the lake below. The views are extensive to the south with Swansea visible as well as the Bristol Channel. Views to the north include Mynydd Epynt and Brecon, with Llandeilo and the Tywi valley to the west.

As in all mountains care is needed when the weather is poor, especially when visibility falls due to mist, fog or driving rain and snow. Navigation can become difficult when landmarks disappear, and is particularly dangerous when walking along the edge of the escarpment. A prismatic compass and local map are essential companions to aid navigation. There are relatively few walkers on the Black Mountain, even when the weather is good and clear, so the rambler must rely on his or her own resources to complete a circuit.

Wildlife

There are numerous different species of bird in the area, and they include the red kite, common buzzard, kestrel, carrion crow, common raven and skylark to name a few of the most obvious residents. The red kite was previously restricted to this and adjoining areas in South Wales such as Mynydd Mallaen, owing to persecution from farmers and gamekeepers who thought (wrongly) that the bird attacked game birds. The red kite has since been re-introduced widely in many parts of Britain, such as the Chilterns and Northamptonshire. The kestrel and buzzard are widely distributed, but the raven is mainly restricted to the higher mountains.
There is a wide distribution of mammals such as field voles, rabbits, foxes, weasels and badgers as well as many songbirds. The skylark is plentiful due to the extensive rough pasture present below the main peaks which allows ground nesting of the species. Pied wagtails are common near the streams and torrents running from the hill tops.

The mountain tops are above the tree line, and sessile oak is found clinging to the lower valley sides where they are sheltered from the winds. There are also a number of conifer forests maintained by the Forestry Commission on the lower slopes.

See also
List of Scheduled prehistoric Monuments in Carmarthenshire

References

External links
 images of Picws Du & surrounding area on the Geograph website

Hewitts of Wales
Nuttalls
Mountains and hills of Carmarthenshire
Black Mountain (hill)